Shaganappi Point station is a CTrain light rail station in Shaganappi, Calgary, Alberta, Canada. It is located in the median of Bow Trail, just west of 26th St. SW, 3km West of the 7 Avenue & 9 Street SW Interlocking. The second station on the West line, it opened with preview service on December 8, 2012, and opened for revenue service on December 10, 2012.

The station has side-loading platforms that are only accessed by ramps from the intersection of Bow Trail and 26 Street SW immediately east. 

The 27-hole Shaganappi Point Golf Course is located near the station.

In its first year of service, Shaganappi Point served an average of 1,320 boardings per day.

The Kerby Centre (a major drop-in centre for seniors) was planned to be relocated to a location beside this LRT station by 2017, from its current location in downtown Calgary.

References 

CTrain stations
Railway stations in Canada opened in 2012